Mikhail Shibun (born 1 January 1996) is a Belarusian professional footballer who plays for Shakhtyor Petrikov.

Honours
Shakhtyor Soligorsk
Belarusian Cup winner: 2018–19

References

External links

Profile at pressball.by

1996 births
Living people
Belarusian footballers
Association football midfielders
FC Shakhtyor Soligorsk players
FC Gorodeya players
FC Torpedo-BelAZ Zhodino players
FC Minsk players
FC Krumkachy Minsk players
FC Shakhtyor Petrikov players